Polly Morgan (born 1980) is a London-based British artist who uses taxidermy to create works of art.

Biography
Polly Morgan was born in Banbury, Oxfordshire, England in 1980, and grew up in the Cotswolds on her family farm, and mentions a lack of squeamishness about death as well as being comfortable with the practice of dealing with the corpses of animals. She moved to East London in 1998 and continues to live there today. Morgan graduated from Queen Mary, University of London, in English Literature in 2002.

During her studies, Morgan worked at Shoreditch Electricity Show Rooms, a bar popular with artists; after graduation, she continued to work there as manager. At 23 Morgan was living above the bar and working out of her apartment, "tinkering with taxidermy." Inspired to create work of her own she took a course with the professional taxidermist George Jamieson, of Cramond, in Edinburgh, during which her intuitive and personal response to the medium were obvious. Morgan's first pieces were commissioned by Bistrotheque, after which she was spotted by Banksy: A lovebird looking in a mirror; a squirrel holding a belljar with a little fly perched inside on top of a sugar cube; a magpie with a jewel in its beak; and a couple of chicks standing on a miniature coffin'. In 2005, he invited her to show her work for Santa's Ghetto, an annual exhibition he organized near London's Oxford Street. Her next piece, a white rat in a champagne glass, was exhibited at Wolfe Lenkiewicz's Zoo Art Fair in 2006 and was purchased by Vanessa Branson. Morgan works from a Bethnal Green studio.

Morgan is a member of the UK Guild of Taxidermists. The animals used in her taxidermy are contributed by a network of clients; the animals Morgan uses have died naturally or had unpreventable deaths. She maintains a detailed log of all dead animals in stock.

Morgan believes that those who consider her work disrespectful or cruel to animals are "childish," and that anthropomorphizing the animals she uses is meaningless. Her work emphasizes and displays animals in a way nontraditional to taxidermy, putting the animals in positions which do not generally imply that they are still alive, rather emphasizing the dying fall of the animal.

Morgan is married to Mat Collishaw with whom she has two sons.

Exhibitions
Notable exhibitions include:
 Still Life After Death, 2006 at Kristy Stubbs Gallery
 The Exquisite Corpse, 2007 at Trinity Church, 1 Marylebone Road
 You Dig the Tunnel, I'll Hide the Soil, 2008 at White Cube
 Mythologies, 2009 at Haunch of Venison
 The Age of the Marvellous, 2009 at All Visual Arts
 Psychopomps, 2010 at Haunch of Venison
 Contemporary Eye: Crossovers, 2010 at Pallant House Gallery
 Passion Fruits, 2011 at ME Collectors Room
 Burials, 2011 at Workshop Venice
 Dead Time, 2011 at Voide, Derry
 Endless Plains, 2012 at All Visual Arts
 10,000 Hours, 2012 at Kunstmuseum Thurgau
 Foundation/Remains, 2013 at The Office Gallery, Nicosia, Cyprus
 The Nature of the Beast, 2013 at The New Art Gallery, Walsall
 Beasts of England, Beasts of Ireland, 2013 at VISUAL Centre for Contemporary Art
 Curiouser and Curiouser, 2014 at Warrington Museum and Art Gallery
 Fates Refrain, 2014 at Robilant + Voena Gallery
 Organic Matters, 2015 at The National Museum of Women in Art
 Dead Animals and the Curious Occurrence of Taxidermy in Contemporary Art, 2016 at David Winton Bell Gallery - Brown University
 Animal Farm, Beastly Muses and Metaphors, 2016 at S|2 GALLERY
 Daydreaming With Stanley Kubrick, 2016 at Somerset House
 5 Years at Heddon Street, 2016 at Pippy Houldsworth Gallery
 Faith and Fathom, 2016 at Galleria Poggiali
 Naturalia, 2017 at Paul Kasmin Gallery

See also
What Do Artists Do All Day?

References

External links
 Polly Morgan homepage
 Artnet
BBC Radio Four interview

1980 births
Living people
Taxidermists
21st-century British artists
English women artists
Women in craft
21st-century British women artists
People from Oxfordshire
21st-century English women
21st-century English people